Lithium disilicate (Li2Si2O5) is a chemical compound that is a glass ceramic. It is widely used as a dental ceramic due to its strength, machinability and translucency.

Use
Lithium disilicate has found applications in dentistry as a dental ceramic material for dental restorations such as crowns, bridges, and veneers in the form of Li2Si2O5. Lithium disilicate has an unusual microstructure that consists of many randomly oriented small and interlocking plate-like needle-like crystals. This structure causes cracks to be deflected, blunted, and/or to branch, which prevents cracks from growing. Lithium disilicate has a biaxial flexible strength in the range of 360 MPa to 400 MPa; in comparison, for metal ceramics this is around 80 to 100 MPa, for veneered zirconia it is approximately 100 MPa, and for leucite glass ceramic it is approximately 150 to 160 MPa. It has high hardness (5.92 +/- 0.18 GPa) and fracture toughness (3.3 +/- 0.14 MPa m1/2). In addition, it can be made to have an appearance that very closely resembles that of natural human teeth.

Lithium disilicate is also used as a non-conductive seal, enamel or feed-through insulator in nickel superalloys or stainless steel, as it has a high thermal expansion.

References

Inorganic silicon compounds
Lithium compounds